Kinsac is  a suburban community in District 2 of the Halifax Regional Municipality, in Nova Scotia, Canada on Nova Scotia Route 354.

External links
History of Kinsac
HRM Civic Address Map

Communities in Halifax, Nova Scotia
General Service Areas in Nova Scotia